Dipyrandium is an aminosteroid neuromuscular blocking agent.

References

Androstanes
Nicotinic antagonists